This is a list of UK television series and specials starring the singer Cliff Richard broadcast on BBC Television.

BBC TV series and specials

The Cliff Richard Show

It's Cliff Richard: Series 1 
Produced by Michael Hurll. Broadcast Saturdays on BBC1 at 6:15pm. Regular series guests: Una Stubbs and Hank B. Marvin with The Breakaways (vocal backing) and Norrie Paramour and his orchestra (musical backing).

Sing a New Song 
One Series. Produced by Raymond Short. Broadcast Sundays on BBC1 at 6:00pm. Series guests: The Settlers.

Specials

It's Cliff Richard: Series 2 
Produced by Michael Hurll. Broadcast Saturdays on BBC1 at 6:15pm (except where noted). Series guests: The Breakaways (vocal backing) and Norrie Parmour & His Orchestra (musical backing)

Bank holiday special

It's Cliff Richard: Series 3
Produced by Michael Hurll. Broadcast Saturdays on BBC1 at 6:15pm (except where noted). Series guests: The Pamela Devis Dancers, The Flirtations and Norrie Paramour & His Orchestra.

For eight weeks, Cliff Richard was the resident guest on the BBC1 TV series Cilla from January 13 - March 3, 1973, starring in A Song for Europe 1973.

It's Cliff Richard: Series 4 
Produced by Brian Whitehouse. Executive Producer: Michael Hurll. Broadcast Saturdays on BBC1. Series guests: Segment choreographed by Nigel Lythgoe, The Nolan Sisters and Alyn Ainsworth's orchestra.

It's Cliff and Friends: Series 1 
Produced by Phil Bishop. Executive Producer: Michael Hurll. Broadcast Saturdays on BBC1. Musical director: Ronnie Hazlehurst.

Televised concerts

Cliff! 
One series. Produced by Norman Stone. Broadcast Mondays on BBC2 at 8:10pm.

Televised concert

Christmas specials

Birthday concert

Retrospective

References

Cliff Richard
British variety television shows